Robert Kee  (5 October 1919 – 11 January 2013) was a British broadcaster, journalist and writer, known for his historical works on World War II and Ireland.

Life and career

Kee was educated at Stowe School, Buckingham, and read history at Magdalen College, Oxford, where he was a pupil, then a friend, of the historian A.J.P. Taylor.

During World War II he served in the Royal Air Force as a bomber pilot. Flying the Handley Page Hampden he was shot down by flak while on a night mine-laying mission off the coast of German-occupied Holland. He was captured and spent three years in a German POW camp. This gave him material for his first book, A Crowd Is Not Company. It was first published as a novel in 1947, but was later revealed to be an autobiography. It recounts his experiences as a prisoner of war and his various escapes from the Nazi camp. The Times describes it as "arguably the best POW book ever written."

His career in journalism began immediately after the Second World War. He worked for the Picture Post, then became a special correspondent for The Sunday Times and, later, The Observer. He was also literary editor of The Spectator. In 1948, Kee co-founded publishing house MacGibbon & Kee with James MacGibbon. In 1949 Kee was a witness at the marriage of his friend George Orwell to Sonia Brownell.

In 1958 he moved into television. He appeared for many years on both the BBC and ITV as a reporter, interviewer and presenter. He presented many current affairs programmes, including Panorama, ITN's First Report and  Channel 4's Seven Days. MacGibbon & Kee was bought by Granada in 1968. He was awarded the BAFTA Richard Dimbleby Award in 1976.

Kee wrote and presented the documentary series  Ireland – A Television History in 1980. The work was shown both in the United Kingdom and the United States and won the Christopher Ewart-Biggs Memorial Prize. Following the series' transmission on RTÉ, the Irish national broadcaster, Kee won a Jacob's Award for his script and presentation.
 
He was involved in the launch of TV-am in 1983 as one of the "Famous Five", along with David Frost, Anna Ford, Michael Parkinson and Angela Rippon. He was also among those who successfully campaigned for the release of the Guildford Four, the Maguire Seven and the Birmingham Six.

Works

A Crowd Is Not Company (1947) POW memoirs, issued as a novel first, reissued 1982
The Impossible Shore (1949) novel
Beyond Defeat by Hans Werner Richter (1950) translator
The Five Seasons by Karl Eska (1954) translator
A Sign Of The Times (1955) novel
Vorkuta A Dramatic First Report on the Slave City in the Soviet Arctic by Joseph Scholmer (1955) translator
Zero Eight Fifteen. The Strange Mutiny of Gunner Asch by Hans Hellmut Kirst (1955) translator
The Sanity Inspectors by Friedrich Deich (1956) translator
Before the Great Snow by Hans Pump (1959) translator
Broadstrop In Season (1959) novel
The Betrayed by Michael Horbach (1959) translator
Refugee World (1961)
Officer Factory by Hans Hellmut Kirst (1962) translator
Forward, Gunner Asch! by Hans Hellmut Kirst (1964) translator
The Revolt of Gunner Asch by Hans Hellmut Kirst (1964) translator
The Return of Gunner Asch by Hans Hellmut Kirst (1967) translator
The Most Distressful Country (1972) The Green Flag vol.1
The Bold Fenian Men (1972) The Green Flag vol.2
Ourselves Alone (1972) The Green Flag vol.3
Ireland: A History (1980)
1939: The Year We Left Behind (1984) as 1939: In the Shadow of the War (US)
We'll Meet Again – Photographs of Daily Life in Britain During World War Two (1984) with Joanna Smith
1945: The World We Fought For (1985)
A Journalist's Odyssey (1985) with Patrick O'Donovan and Hermione O'Donovan 
Trial & Error: the Maguires, the Guildford pub bombings and British justice (1986)
Munich: The Eleventh Hour (1988)
The Picture Post Album: A 50th Anniversary Collection (1989)
The Laurel and the Ivy: The Story of Charles Stewart Parnell and Irish Nationalism (1993)
The Green Flag: A History of Irish Nationalism (2000) one-volume edition
Another Kind of Cinderella (1997) stories, with Angela Huth

References

External links

Page at Spartacus

1919 births
2013 deaths
Alumni of Magdalen College, Oxford
British male journalists
British World War II pilots
British World War II bomber pilots
British World War II prisoners of war
British writers
Christopher Ewart-Biggs Memorial Prize recipients
Commanders of the Order of the British Empire
ITN newsreaders and journalists
Jacob's Award winners
Panorama (British TV programme)
People educated at Stowe School
World War II prisoners of war held by Germany
Historians of Ireland